San Francisco de Milagro (also known as Milagro, which is Spanish for Miracle) is a city located in Guayas, Ecuador. It is the seat of Milagro Canton.

Milagro is the second largest city in the province of Guayas.  As of the census of 2007, there were 180,103 people residing within the canton limits.

Denisse Robles, mayor (2014), pledged to get a city railway station and to improve the coverage of Milagro's drinking water. She was elected the mayor of Milagro in 2014 with 38% of the vote, finishing ahead of the incumbent mayor Francisco Asan. Robles assumed office in May 2014, becoming the first female mayor of the city, and the youngest mayor in the country.

Climate

External links

 www.milagro.gob.ec

References

Populated places in Guayas Province